Mohammad-Ali Najafi (born 13 January 1952) is an Iranian mathematician and reformist politician who was the Mayor of Tehran, serving in the post for eight months, until April 2018. He held cabinet portfolios during the 1980s, 1990s and 2010s. He is also a retired professor of mathematics at Sharif University of Technology.

Early life and education
Najafi was born in Tehran on 13 January 1952. He ranked first in Iranian national university entrance exam and enrolled in Sharif University of Technology (then known as Aryamehr University of Technology). He earned a Bachelor of Science degree in mathematics from the Sharif University of Technology. Following his bachelors, he enrolled in the graduate program at the Massachusetts Institute of Technology. He received his Master of Science degree in mathematics with the final grade of A+ in 1976 but dropped out of PhD program in 1978 during the Iranian revolution to return to Iran.

Career
Following the Iranian revolution of 1979, Najafi returned to Iran and became a faculty member at Isfahan University of Technology in 1979 and he was the chair of the university from 1980 to 1981. He was a faculty member at department of mathematical sciences in Sharif University of Technology from 1984 to 1988, when he moved to government.

At the end of the reformist government of Mohammad Khatami and following Mahmoud Ahmadinejad's election Najafi moved back to university and has been faculty in the department of mathematics at Sharif University of Technology working on representation theory.

He served as an advisor to Mostafa Chamran. He was the minister of higher education from 1981 to 1984 in the cabinet of then Prime Minister Mir-Hossein Mousavi. In 1989, he became the minister of education under then President Hashemi Rafsanjani and served until 1997. In 1997, he was appointed vice president and head of the Planning and Budget Organization by President Mohammad Khatami, but after a merge of the organization with another he was succeeded by Mohammad Reza Aref in the post. Najafi was an advisor to President Khatami and the senior advisor to the minister of industries from 2001 to 2005. In the 2006 Iranian City and Village Councils elections, Najafi ran for a seat in Tehran City Council. He headed a list named "The Union of reformists" (ائتلاف اصلاح‌طلبان). This was the first time Najafi ran in a general election in Iran. He was not sought for a reelection in 2013 election. He was also an advisor to Mahdi Karroubi. He is the cofounder of the Executives of Construction Party.

He was nominated as minister of education by Hassan Rouhani. However, the Parliament did not approve his appointment on 15 August 2013. He received 142 votes in favor, 133 votes against, and 9 abstentions. He was appointed head of Cultural Heritage, Handcrafts and Tourism Organization on 17 August. However, Najafi resigned from his position on 30 January 2014 due to health problems, making it the first change in Rouhani's cabinet.

Mayor of Tehran 
On 21 July 2017, Najafi was the candidate with the most votes among the seven top candidates for Mayor of Tehran and on 10 August 2017, unanimously elected as the new mayor by the City Council of Tehran defeating Elaheh Koulaei and Mohsen Mehralizadeh. The decision was unofficial, and became effective when the council convened its first official meeting on 23 August. After his office-taking took longer than usual, the council appointed a caretaker on 27 August. Hours later and minutes to midnight the Interior Ministry approved his credentials and he took office.

Najafi resigned on 14 March 2018 after a video surfaced of him watching girls dancing, which offended Iranian clerics. However, according to one of the council members, the resignation was due to medical problems.

Arrest 
On 28 May 2019, Najafi's second wife, Mitra Ostad, was found dead in the bathtub of her home in Sa'adat Abad's Armita Tower. Iranian Police announced she was killed by gunshots, with a bullet in her heart and another in her arm. Hours later, Najafi confessed to murder by referral to police The ISNA news agency, stated that the head of the intelligence police, Alireza Lotfi, said about the details of Mr. Najafi's confession: "In his initial conversations, he stated that this action was carried out due to psychological pressures and family problems." The head of Tehran police's criminal investigation department said he was in detention, and that police had discovered the weapons he shot with.

On 30 July 2019, he was sentenced to death for murdering his wife. However, he was temporarily released from prison on 28 August 2019 after family of his former wife was satisfied with the verdict.

The firearm that was used is a 9mm pistol that resembles a Beretta 92.

References

1952 births
Living people
Sharif University of Technology alumni
Academic staff of Sharif University of Technology
Heads of universities and colleges in Iran
Government ministers of Iran
Iranian Vice Ministers
Iranian Mathematics Competition Medalists
Executives of Construction Party politicians
Tehran Councillors 2007–2013
Presidential advisers of Iran
Impeached Iranian officials
Heads of Cultural Heritage, Handicrafts and Tourism Organization
Mayors of Tehran
20th-century Iranian mathematicians
Uxoricides
Ministers of science of Iran
Massachusetts Institute of Technology School of Science alumni